Box Car Blues, released in 1930, is the fifth title in the Looney Tunes series. It features Bosko and a pig traveling as hobos in a boxcar.

Plot
The film opens with a "toot-toot" and a train is seen chugging down the tracks, whistling every so often. The front wheels turn into a pair of hands, that manually squeeze the whistle in order to make a distinct honking sound. The scene then moves to a boxcar at the back of the train, where Bosko is singing and dancing, accompanied by a banjo playing pig. They are quite jolly until Bosko starts a mournful rendition of Cryin' for the Carolines, at which the pig starts to cry. Suddenly Bosko and the pig are thrown towards the back of the boxcar. The pig seems to be out cold whilst Bosko looks around, trying to understand what is going on. Bosko tries to revive the pig but is unsuccessful. The scene pans to show that the train is climbing a hill, which explains the tilted boxcar.

The train straightens itself at the top of the hill but then goes over a bridge, which bends exaggeratedly to accommodate its weight. Through a tunnel and then uphill again at almost a ninety degree angle, the train is now exhausted and starts panting as it begins to slow down. It then starts crawling like a giant caterpillar, curling and uncurling itself as it moves up the hill. Just a few feet from the summit, the train reaches out its wheels as hands in an attempt to get a handhold but as it grabs the mountain, we see a part of the hillside peeling away and displaying spotted underwear. The mountain, using tree trunks as hands, reaches back and pulls up its pseudo-pants, looking quite angry as it does so. The train now begins to haul itself up using the railroad as a rope, manages to reach the top and goes over. However, the last boxcar breaks free and races back down the steep slope.

Bosko lifts a small hatch in the roof and looks out frantically. His head gets knocked off by an overhanging sign and is left bouncing by itself on the roof. His headless body then climbs onto the roof and manages to reattach his head. Next the boxcar splits in two and Bosko is left with one foot on each side, balancing precariously over the speeding vehicle. Oddly enough, we do not see any sign of the banjo playing pig inside the split boxcar, which eventually comes back together. The boxcar continues to split and come together in this fashion several times. At one point, Bosko lengthens his neck, twists it into a winch of sorts and uses it to haul the boxcar pieces back together. The next tunnel is so low that Bosko gets thrown off the roof and tumbles down the outside of the tunnel, falling astride a cow at the other end.

The cow starts galloping down the railtrack and Bosko gets thrown off as they enter another tunnel. He tumbles over it and ends up back on the roof of the boxcar which is now speeding along just behind the running cow. The boxcar goes over a bump and Bosko gets thrown off again, only to grab the edge of a pipe attached to the roof, which detaches from the side of the boxcar and drags Bosko along, bumping him hard against the ground. Bosko is then dragged through several trees and electricity poles when he eventually hits a bump in the road and gets thrown back onto the roof of the boxcar, which breaks and drops him inside.

The cow sees a tree and comes to halt, causing the boxcar to flatten it against the tree. The cow then unravels itself, in the manner of an accordion and walks away, whilst pieces of the shattered boxcar rain down including Bosko and the pig, who fall onto a flat, open wagon. The pig opens an umbrella to shield them from the falling debris. When the pig finally puts his umbrella away, assuming that the debris has stopped falling, one last piece falls directly on his head. This gives him a large bump and he starts to cry. Bosko dries his tears and pushes off down the track on the little wagon. He starts playing the banjo and singing as the pig cheers up and starts to sing along with him. They disappear into a tunnel as we see the closing credits.

Other
This short is said to feature only rudimentary backgrounds although most other titles in the series include more complex backgrounds.

The gag involving a cow getting smashed against a tree and turning into an accordion is later reused in Bosko and Bruno (1932).

The engine on the train is at first being a 2-2-0 engine or a Planet type and is now an 0-4-0 while climbing the hill.

References

External links
 
 
 

1930 films
1930 animated films
Looney Tunes shorts
Warner Bros. Cartoons animated short films
American black-and-white films
Films directed by Hugh Harman
Films directed by Rudolf Ising
Films set on trains
Bosko films
Films scored by Frank Marsales
African-American animated films
Animated films about animals
Films about pigs
1930s Warner Bros. animated short films